There have been three baronetcies created for persons with the surname Turner, all in the Baronetage of Great Britain, one of which became extinct after two holders, one after three and one of which is extant however became renamed in 1766 to match the new successor's new surname Page-Turner and subsequently devolved to the Dryden baronets.

The Turner Baronetcy, of Warham in the County of Norfolk, was created in the Baronetage of Great Britain on 27 April 1727 for Charles Turner, for many years Member of Parliament for King's Lynn. The second and third Baronet's also represented this constituency in Parliament. The title became extinct on the latter's death in 1780.

The Turner, later Page-Turner, later Dryden Baronetcy, of Ambrosden in the County of Oxford, was created in the Baronetage of Great Britain on 24 August 1733. For more information on this creation, see Dryden baronets.

The Turner Baronetcy, of Kirkleatham in the County of York, was created in the Baronetage of Great Britain on 8 May 1782 for Charles Turner, Member of Parliament for York. The second Baronet was Member of Parliament for Kingston upon Hull. The title became extinct on his death in 1810.

Turner baronets, of Warham (1727)
Sir Charles Turner, 1st Baronet (1666–1738)
Sir John Turner, 2nd Baronet (1668–1739)
Sir John Turner, 3rd Baronet (–1780)

Turner, later Page-Turner, later Dryden baronets, of Ambrosden (1733)
see Dryden baronets

Turner baronets, of Kirkleatham (1782)

Sir Charles Turner, 1st Baronet (c. 1727–1783)
Sir Charles Turner, 2nd Baronet (1773–1810)

References

 
Baronetcies in the Baronetage of Great Britain
Extinct baronetcies in the Baronetage of Great Britain
1727 establishments in Great Britain
1780 disestablishments in Great Britain
1733 establishments in Great Britain
1782 establishments in Great Britain
1810 disestablishments in the United Kingdom